Gradunguloonops is a genus of spiders in the family Oonopidae. It was first described in 2015 by Grismado et al.. , it contains 12 South American species.

Species
Gradunguloonops comprises the following species:
Gradunguloonops amazonicus Grismado, Izquierdo, González M. & Ramírez, 2015
Gradunguloonops benavidesae Grismado, Izquierdo, González M. & Ramírez, 2015
Gradunguloonops bonaldoi Grismado, Izquierdo, González M. & Ramírez, 2015
Gradunguloonops erwini Grismado, Izquierdo, González M. & Ramírez, 2015
Gradunguloonops florezi Grismado, Izquierdo, González M. & Ramírez, 2015
Gradunguloonops juruti Grismado, Izquierdo, González M. & Ramírez, 2015
Gradunguloonops mutum Grismado, Izquierdo, González M. & Ramírez, 2015
Gradunguloonops nadineae Grismado, Izquierdo, González M. & Ramírez, 2015
Gradunguloonops orellana Grismado, Izquierdo, González M. & Ramírez, 2015
Gradunguloonops pacanari Grismado, Izquierdo, González M. & Ramírez, 2015
Gradunguloonops raptor Grismado, Izquierdo, González M. & Ramírez, 2015
Gradunguloonops urucu Grismado, Izquierdo, González M. & Ramírez, 2015

References

Oonopidae
Araneomorphae genera
Spiders of South America